Sphenomorphus cophias, the Tahan Mountain forest skink, is a species of skink. It is endemic to the Banjaran Timur mountains in Pahang, Peninsular Malaysia.

References

cophias
Endemic fauna of Malaysia
Reptiles of Malaysia
Reptiles described in 1908
Taxa named by George Albert Boulenger
Reptiles of the Malay Peninsula